Bulamaji (also Romanized as Būlāmājī, Bulamāji, and Boolamaji; also known as Balā Māchī, Bolāmājī, and Bula-Madzhid) is a village in Sojas Rud Rural District, Sojas Rud District, Khodabandeh County, Zanjan Province, Iran. At the 2006 census, its population was 755, in 197 families.

References 

Populated places in Khodabandeh County